Henrikas Natalevičius  (born 1953 in Vilnius) is a Lithuanian painter.
Henrikas is a Lithuanian artist.
His works have been displayed in galleries all over Lithuania, in Vilnius, the Lithuanian Art Museum and the National M. K. Čiurlionis Museum of Art in Kaunas.

See also
List of Lithuanian painters

References

This article was initially translated from the Lithuanian Wikipedia.

Lithuanian painters
1953 births
Living people
Artists from Vilnius